The Keep River is a river located in the Victoria Bonaparte bioregion of Western Australia and the Northern Territory in Australia.

Location and features
The river rises just south of the Newry Station homestead then flows in a northerly direction crossing the Victoria Highway and then flowing through the Keep River National Park and veering westward across the border into Western Australia then veering east back into the Northern Territory. It then continues north before discharging into the Joseph Bonaparte Gulf and the Timor Sea.

Important wetlands are found in the lower reaches of the river, forming suitable habitat for waterfowl breeding colonies and roosting sites for migratory shorebirds. Large areas of rice-grass floodplain grasslands are also found along the river.

The estuary formed at the river mouth is in near pristine condition. It is tide dominated in nature with a tide dominated delta having multiple channels and is surrounded by an area of  covered with mangroves.

Flora and fauna
Riparian vegetation found along the margins in the river include Melaleuca, Barringtonia acutangula, Nauclea orientalis, reeds and taro are common in the upper reaches.
In pools along the river sponges such as Spongillidae can be found on rocks.
Toward the national park area aquatic vegetation such as species of Nymphea, Hydrilla verticillata and species of Chara become more frequent forming dense mats in some areas. Riparian vegetation includes Melaleuca, Barringtonia acutangula, Nauclea orientalis, Lysiphyllum cunninghamii and Pandanus spiralis.

Marine fauna found along the river include fish including freshwater sawfish, dwarf wawfish, ox-eye herring, bony bream, short-tail thryssa, several species of catfish such as Arius and Anodontiglanis dahli, freshwater longtom, species of rainbowfish, hardeyheads, species of glassfish, species of grunter, species of mullet, spotted archerfish, species of gudgeon, species of goby and baramundi.

In February  2022, the Northern Territory Land Corporation released 67,500 hectares  for a planned conversion of the landscape towards the cultivation of rice, cotton and various fruits like mangoes and bananas. The effects of this major project on the  natural ecology and Aboriginal sacred sites are not yet known.

History
The traditional owners of the area are the Kadjerong and Duulngari peoples to the northern end and the Miriwoong people to the south.

The origin of the name is not known but it is thought to have been named for Henry Francis Keep who was a store keeper in Wyndham. The first written record of the name was in the diary of explorer and pastoralist, Michael Durack, who wrote about a "trip to Keep River" in 1894.

See also

List of rivers of Northern Territory

References

Rivers of the Northern Territory